R. Pudupatti is a panchayat town in Rasipuram taluk in Namakkal district in the Indian state of Tamil Nadu.

Demographics 
 India census, R. Pudupatti had a population of more than 12000. Males constitute 51% of the population and females 49%. R.Pudupatti has an average literacy rate of 56%, lower than the national average of 59.5%: male literacy is 64%, and female literacy is 47%. In R. Pudupatti, 9% of the population is under 6 years of age. R.Pudupatti contains R.P. Kattur, Pudur Malayampatti, Vanikinaru, Munniyapan pudur and Kilur.

Education 
R. Puduppatti village panchayat has one high school and three primary schools all of which are run by the government of Tamil Nadu.

Economy 
The town has several banks and ATMs.

Wards 
There are 15 wards in R. Puduppatti.
1. Forest bungalow Street
2. Muniyappan pudur
3.Uppukal Thittu
4. NigananKaradu
5. Bharathi nagar
6. Panakadu
7.Pudur kattu kottai
8.kiramanatham st
9.Periyamuniappan kovil
10.Sathya Nagar
11.Sathya Nagar
12.Pudhu Colony

References 

Cities and towns in Namakkal district